Buchanania barberi is a species of plant in the family Anacardiaceae. It is endemic to Nadari in Travancore District of Kerala, India. It is threatened by habitat loss.

References

barberi
Endemic flora of India (region)
Flora of Kerala
Critically endangered plants
Taxonomy articles created by Polbot